Sudharmaswami ( or Sudharman; 607 BC – 507 BC) was the fifth ganadhara of Mahavira. All the current Jain acharyas and monks follow his rule.

Life
Sudharmaswami was the spiritual successor of Indrabhuti Gautama in religious order reorganised by Mahavira. He is traditionally dated from 607 to 506 BCE. He is believed in Jain tradition to have obtained omniscience after 12 years in 515 BC. He is believed to have attained nirvana in 507 BC at the age of 100. The leadership of religious order was then transferred to Jambuswami who served for 44 years and was the last Ghandhara who survived after kaal(death) of Mahavira

For Jains, their scriptures represent the literal words of Mahavira and the other tirthankaras only to the extent that the agama is a series of beginning-less, endless and fixed truths, a tradition without any origin, human or divine, which in this world age has been channelled through Sudharmāsvāmī.

See also
 Jain monasticism

References

Citations

Sources
 
 
 

Indian Jain monks
6th-century BC Indian Jains
6th-century BC Jain monks
6th-century BC Indian monks
Jain acharyas
607 BC births
507 BC deaths
Ganadhara
6th-century BC Indian people